Love Over Night is a 1928 American silent comedy film produced and distributed by Pathé Exchange and starring Rod La Rocque. The film was directed by Edward H. Griffith.

A print of Love Over Night is said to be held at the Museum of Modern Art, New York.

Cast
Rod La Rocque as Richard Hill
Jeanette Loff as Jeanette Stewart
Richard Tucker as Richard T. Thorne
Tom Kennedy as Detective
Mary Carr as Grandmother

References

External links

Lobby poster

1928 films
American silent feature films
1928 comedy films
Silent American comedy films
Films directed by Edward H. Griffith
American black-and-white films
Pathé Exchange films
1920s American films